The Ospedale Reservoir is a reservoir in the Corse-du-Sud department of France on the island of Corsica.
It holds drinking water for the southeast of the island, including Porto-Vecchio.
It is surrounded by a forest that has been designated a Zone naturelle d'intérêt écologique, faunistique et floristique (ZNIEFF).

Location

The Ospedale Reservoir is in the commune of Porto-Vecchio to the north of the village of L'Ospedale.
Its name means "hospital", since it was once the location of a regional hospital.
The reservoir is formed by a dam (Barrage de l'Ospedale) on the Ruisseau de Palavesani, a tributary of the Oso river.
It is southeast of the  Punta di U Corbu.
The D368 road runs along its southeast shore.

Dam

The dam was built in the late 1970s using levée techniques.
It came into service in 1979 and is operated by the Office d’Equipement Hydraulique de Corse.

The dam is subject to a complete inspection every ten years.
Depending on the amount of rain during the summer and the number of tourists (who drink the water) it may or may not be necessary to drain water from the reservoir.

Reservoir

The reservoir covers  within a  watershed.
The reservoir holds the main water reserve for the Porto-Vecchio region.
It supplies drinking water to the whole of the Extrême Sud region.
In years of low rainfall this can cause problems during the summer tourist season.

The articial lake is surrounded by a landscape of rocky scree and a forest of laricio pines and beeches.
It has become became a tourist spot within the beautiful  Ospedale Forest (Forêt de l’Ospedale).
However, swimming is prohibited since the lake is a source of drinking water.

ZNIEFF

The reservoir and surrounding forest have been designated a type 1 continental Zone naturelle d'intérêt écologique, faunistique et floristique (ZNIEFF).
The ZNIEFF includes the Natura 2000 Zone "Forêt de l'Ospédale", the lake and its surroundings, the left bank of the lake where bats roost and an extension towards the northwest holding Yew habitats.

The ZNIEFF is in Crystalline Corsica, a large granite massif that is altered on the surface and has some fractures and veins of quartz.
Where the bedrock is exposed it is pink granite, or leucogranite, rich in feldspathic minerals.
Altitudes range from 
The forest has some islets of Yew, but is dominated by pine.

The ZNIEFF is a biotope favored by the Corsican nuthatch (Sitta whiteheadi), the only bird that is endemic to France.
It is also home to golden eagle (Aquila chrysaetos) and long-eared owl (Asio otus).
It has the only breeding colony of grey long-eared bat (Plecotus austriacus) found in Corsica.
It is sometimes visited by mouflons (Ovis gmelini), and is potentially important for this species to repopulate its original range.
The site holds all species of Corsican amphibians, and contains several reptiles and amphibians of European interest including European leaf-toed gecko (Euleptes europaea), Corsican painted frog (Discoglossus montalentii), Tyrrhenian painted frog (Discoglossus sardus) and Corsican brook salamander (Euproctus montanus).
The area is also home to protected insects such as Corsican swallowtail (Papilio hospiton), Corsican fritillary (Fabriciana elisa) and Rosalia longicorn (Rosalia alpin).

See also

List of waterbodies of Corse-du-Sud

Notes

Sources

Reservoirs of Corsica